Élan vital is a term coined by French philosopher Henri Bergson in his 1907 book Creative Evolution, in which he addresses the question of self-organisation and spontaneous morphogenesis of things in an increasingly complex manner. Élan vital was translated in the English edition as "vital impetus", but is usually translated by his detractors as "vital force".  It is a hypothetical explanation for evolution and development of organisms, which Bergson linked closely with consciousness – the intuitive perception of experience and the flow of inner time.

Precursors
Distant anticipations of Bergson can be found in the work of the pre-Christian Stoic philosopher Posidonius, who postulated a "vital force" emanated by the sun to all living creatures on the Earth's surface, and in that of Zeno of Elea.  The concept of élan vital is also similar to Baruch Spinoza's concept of conatus as well as Arthur Schopenhauer's concept of the will-to-live and the Sanskrit āyus or "life principle".

Influence 

The French philosopher Gilles Deleuze attempted to recoup the novelty of Bergson's idea in his book Bergsonism, though the term itself underwent substantial changes by Deleuze. No longer considered a mystical, elusive force acting on brute matter, as it was in the vitalist debates of the late 19th century, élan vital in Deleuze's hands denotes an internal force, a substance in which the distinction between organic and inorganic matter is indiscernible, and the emergence of life undecidable.

In 1912 Beatrice M. Hinkle wrote that Carl Gustav Jung's conception of libido was similar to Bergson's élan vital.

The notion of élan vital had considerable influence on the psychiatrist and phenomenologist Eugène Minkowski and his own concept of a personal élan – the element which keeps us in touch with a feeling of life.

The French army incorporated the doctrine of élan vital into its thinking during the leadup to the First World War by arguing that the spirit of individual soldiers was more important for victory than weapons.

Criticism 

 The general consensus of geneticists is that they see no "life force" other than the organisational matrix contained in the genes themselves, according to R.F. Weir.
 The British secular humanist biologist Julian Huxley dryly remarked that Bergson's élan vital is no better an explanation of life than is explaining the operation of a railway engine by its élan locomotif ("locomotive driving force"). The same alleged epistemological fallacy is parodied in Molière's Le Malade imaginaire, where a quack "answers" the question of "Why does opium cause sleep?" with "Because of its soporific power".  However, Huxley happily used the term élan vital in a more metaphorical sense:

 The author and popular Christian theologian C. S. Lewis rejected Bergson's concept in his essay The Weight of Glory stating "...even if all the happiness they promised could come to man on earth, yet still each generation would lose it by death, including the last generation of all, and the whole story would be nothing, not even a story, for ever and ever. Hence all the nonsense that Mr. Shaw puts into the final speech of Lilith, and Bergson's remark that the élan vital is capable of surmounting all obstacles, perhaps even death—as if we could believe that any social or biological development on this planet will delay the senility of the sun or reverse the second law of thermodynamics."

See also 

 Conatus
 Emergence
 Joie de vivre
 Hylozoism
 Orthogenesis
 Parable of the Invisible Gardener
 Vis viva

References 

Henri Bergson
Vitalism
Concepts in metaphysics
Emergence